Mehdigulu Khan Utsmiyev (1855, Shusha – 1900, Tiflis) was a lyrical poet of Azerbaijan of Kumyk and Javanshir descent, a lieutenant colonel in the Imperial Russian Army. He authored poetry under pseudonym Vafa.

Life 
Mehdigulu was born in 1855 in Shusha in the family of a Kumyk major-general, Khasay khan Utsmiyev (1808–1866) and Azerbaijani poetess Khurshidbanu Natavan. He was named after Mehdigulu Khan, last khan of Karabakh Khanate.

In 1859, Alexandre Dumas wrote about him: "a five- or six-year-old boy probably instinctively holding a kinjal... This was a really sharp dagger, which a French mother would never give to her child."

Military career 

He enrolled in military in 1871 and received silver medal same year "For greeting the Sovereign Emperor in Tiflis in 1871". He was later to promoted to Praporshchik on 9 November 1871. By 1876 he continued on cavalry branch, assigned to a squadron. In 1877, he was put under commander of Caucasus Military District for special assignments.

Joining Russo-Turkish War of 1877–1878, he usually fought under Iosif Gurko, who led the spearhead of the Russian invasion, took Tarnovo on July 7, crossed the Balkans by the Haim Boaz pass—which debouches near Hainkyoi—and, despite considerable resistance, captured Uflani, Maglizh and Kazanlak; on July 18 he participated attack on Shipka, which was evacuated by the Turks the following day. He returned to Caucasus after Treaty of Berlin and received awards for his bravery and participation.

He was transferred to the Life Guards Cossack Regiment of His Majesty with rank of cornet on April 21, 1879. He served as from 1890 to 1895 Rittmeister of the army cavalry and as adjutant to commander of Caucasus Military District. Later in 1895, he received his highest rank of lieutenant colonel. He served as staff officer from 1897 to 1900 of Caucasus Military District.

According to his service record, he Utsmiev owned a family estate consisting of two houses in the city of Shusha, two caravanserais near Khankendi, gardens, mills, and also an uninhabited estate acquired with his sister in  Khasavyurt. He was also granted estates in the Shusha: Malıbəyli, Qiyaslı, Xıdırlı, Bilaghan, Ahmadvar, Qarvand-Meydan, Salvard, Qaraqoyunlu, İlxıçılar, etc. He died in 1900 in Tiflis and was buried in Aghdam.

Family 

He married his 2nd cousin Saltanatbeyim Javanshir (daughter of Karim agha Javanshir (1826-1907), a grandson of Ibrahim Khalil Khan) in 1871 and had a son and 3 daughters:

 Agha Bike (August 1873 - 1942) — married Akbar Mirza Qajar (grandson of Bahman Mirza via Reza Qoli Mirza)
 Reza Qoli Mirza
 Rukn al-Din Mirza
 Dilshad Qajar — Maid of Honour to Empress Maria Alexandrovna, married to Isgandar bey Rustambayov
 Saray Melik
 Bilgeyisbike (July 1874 - ) 
 Azizabike (b. January 1876)
 Khasay Utsmiev (28 August 1881 - 6 October 1925) — married Sariyya Rustambayova (his own niece Dilshad's daughter) and later Sofia Yastremskoy
 Mehdi Utsmiev (6 February 1906, Shusha - 17 January 1993, Moscow)
 Said Utsmiev (6 January 1907, Tbilisi - 15 August 1998)
 Leyla Utsmieva (19 September 1910 - 8 June 1996, Baku)

Awards and decorations 

  4th class Order of St. Anna with inscription "For Bravery" (25 September 1877)
  3rd class Order of St. Stanislaus with sword and bow (25 September 1877)
  3rd class Order of St. Anna with sword and bow (3 November 1877)
  4th class Order of St. Vladimir (3 November 1877)
  Order of the Cross of Takovo (awarded by Milan I of Serbia on 21 February 1880)
  3rd class Order of the Lion and the Sun (30 September 1881)
  2nd class Order of St. Stanislaus (30 August 1887)
  2nd class Order of St. Anna (30 August 1891)
 Light bronze medal in memory of  Russo-Turkish War of 1877–1878 (awarded by Alexander III of Russia on unknown date)

References

External links
 Grandson of Khasay and Natavan (Russian)

1855 births
1900 deaths
Azerbaijani poets
Writers from Shusha
Military personnel from Shusha
Persian-language poets
19th-century poets
Azerbaijani people of Kumyk descent
Burials at Pantheon of prominent Azerbaijanis